Mary Matha Arts and Science College is a Government of India aided college in the State of Kerala that is affiliated to Kannur University and managed by the Syro-Malabar Catholic Diocese of Mananthavady.

The college was accredited in 2006 by the National Assessment and Accreditation Council (NAAC) at B++ (83.5%) Grade. According to the directives of the NAAC, the college has established an Internal Quality Assurance Cell (IQAC) for the sustenance and enhancement of quality in all accredited higher education institutions in India.

History
The college was established in 1995.

Courses Offered
Programmes:

 B.A. Functional English
 B.A. Social Science-Economics
 B.Com with Computer Application
 B.Sc. Chemistry
 B.Sc. Computer Science
 B.Sc. Mathematics
 B.Sc. Physics
 B.Sc. Zoology
 M.Sc. Computer Science
 M.Sc. Mathematics
 PhD Mathematics
 PhD Zoology

References

External links
 Mary Matha Arts and Science College - website

Universities and colleges in Wayanad district
Colleges affiliated to Kannur University
Educational institutions established in 1996
Arts and Science colleges in Kerala
Catholic universities and colleges in India
Mananthavady Area
1996 establishments in Kerala